The Glenwood Archeological District is a nationally recognized historic district and archaeological sites located in the vicinity of Glenwood, Iowa, United States.  It is one of nine sites from the Nebraska Phase of the Woodland period recognized by archaeologists, and the only one located east of the Missouri River.  The district is made up of earth lodge sites, mortuary sites and artifact scatters from the Glenwood culture.  They date from sometime between 1250 and 1400 C.E.  The district was listed on the National Register of Historic Places in 2013.

References

Protected areas established in 1968
Native American history of Iowa
Woodland period
Protected areas of Mills County, Iowa
National Register of Historic Places in Mills County, Iowa
Archaeological sites on the National Register of Historic Places in Iowa
Historic districts on the National Register of Historic Places in Iowa